The Man from U.N.C.L.E. is an American television series that ran for three and a half seasons on NBC, from September 22, 1964 to January 15, 1968. It was cancelled midway through its fourth season. 105 episodes were produced, each with a 50-minute running time. Season One was filmed entirely in black and white, except for the pilot episode, "The Vulcan Affair," and "The Double Affair", which were filmed in color since they were planned to be turned into feature films.

Additional scenes filmed later, in the case of "Vulcan," and in the case of "Double," concurrently. (The portions of "The 4 Steps Affair" which included the expanded scenes from both feature films had been filmed in color even though all Season One episodes were broadcast in black & white.) All subsequent seasons were broadcast in color. Eight feature-length motion pictures were released based on single or double episodes of the show. All 105 episodes were released on DVD in 2007.

Series overview

Episodes

Season 1 (1964–65)

Season 2 (1965–66)
{{Episode table |background=#0000FF |overall=5 |season=5 |title=22 |director=20 |writer=20 |airdate=18 |episodes=

{{Episode list
 |EpisodeNumber=37
 |EpisodeNumber2=8
|Title=The Tigers are Coming Affair
 |DirectedBy=Herschel Daugherty
 |WrittenBy=
 |OriginalAirDate=
 |ShortSummary=Solo and Illya travel to India to help a French botanist discover why the jungle is dying and its inhabitants are vanishing. Jill Ireland and scriptwriter Alan Caillou guest star. (The following season Caillou would appear in The Girl From U.N.C.L.E.'''s "The Jewels of Topango Affair" and "The Phi Beta Killer Affair," neither of which he wrote.)
 |LineColor=0000FF

}}

}}

Season 3 (1966–67)

Season 4 (1967–68)

Television film (1983)

Home releases
The complete series was released on DVD by Warner Home Video, as was a collection of the Man from U.N.C.L.E.'' feature films. The reunion TV-movie was released by Paramount Home Entertainment.

References

External links
 

Man from U.N.C.L.E.
Man from U.N.C.L.E.
Episodes